The Sumatran shortwing (Brachypteryx saturata) is a species of bird in the Old World flycatcher family Muscicapidae. It is endemic to the island of Sumatra in western Indonesia where it favours montane forest.

This species was formerly considered as a subspecies of the white-browed shortwing, now the Javan shortwing (Brachypteryx montana). The white-browed shortwing was split into five separate species based on the deep genetic difference between the populations coupled with the significant differences in plumage and vocalization.

References

Sumatran shortwing
Birds described in 1879